Beyond the Infinite Two Minutes is a 2020 Japanese science fiction comedy film written by Makoto Ueda and cinematographed and directed by Junta Yamaguchi in his directorial debut.

Plot 
The film begins when café owner Kato (Kazunari Tosa) discovers his computer's monitor shows what will happen two minutes into the future from the perspective of the television in the café, which displays what happened two minutes into the past. The computer is brought down to face the television, creating a Droste effect, allowing the characters to see several minutes into the future.

Cast
 Kazunari Tosa
 Riko Fujitani
 Masashi Suwa
 Yoshifumi Sakai
 Haruki Nakagawa
 Munenori Nagano
 Takashi Sumita
 Chikara Honda
 Aki Asakura

Production 
The film was shot over the course of seven days in a Kyoto café by members of the Europe Kikaku theater troupe. The film, which is edited to appear as if it was shot in one long shot, is an example of nagamawashi, a microgenre of mostly-low-budget one-shot Japanese films that have gained popularity after the success of One Cut of the Dead in 2017.

Release and reception 
The film premiered at Tollywood, a small Tokyo cinema, to an audience of twelve. However, due to the COVID-19 pandemic severely limiting production and release of mainstream films, the film was selected to be screened by major theater chain Toho Cinemas.

The film was praised for its playful energy and industrious low-budget spirit.

References

External links 
 

2020 films
Films about time travel
Japanese science fiction comedy films
One-shot films